Japanese Tears is the third album by guitarist Denny Laine, released shortly before the demise of Paul McCartney's band Wings, of which Laine was a member. The album was released in 1980.

Background 

In January 1980, Wings planned a tour of Japan.  However, upon the band's arrival at the airport in Japan, Paul McCartney was arrested for marijuana possession.  The tour was cancelled, and McCartney then decided to release a solo album (McCartney II) instead of touring, putting Wings on hiatus.

Laine decided to work on his own solo project (his third since joining Wings), and he released a single, "Japanese Tears".  It became the title track of his album.

The album also included three previously unreleased Laine compositions—"Send Me The Heart" (co-written by Paul McCartney), "I Would Only Smile", and "Weep for Love"—that had been recorded by different versions of Wings between 1972 and 1978 with Laine singing lead.  In addition, it featured remakes of the Moody Blues' 1965 hit "Go Now", which was originally sung by Laine and which Laine with Wings performed on tour, and a 1967 Laine composition, "Say You Don't Mind", that had become a top-20 UK hit in 1972 for Colin Blunstone.  Two other songs featured the short-lived Denny Laine Band, which included fellow Wings member Steve Holley on drums,  Andy Richards on keyboards and Laine's wife Jo Jo on backing vocals.

This album has been re-issued several times, under a variety of titles, on an assortment of labels.

Reception

AllMusic gave the album a generally positive retrospective review, calling it "a look at one of rock's minor league players done well." They remarked that the album lacks coherency due to the tracks having been both written and recorded during wildly divergent periods of Laine's career, but found that it nonetheless has "charm", singling out the title track and "Go Now" as highlights.

Track listing 
All songs written by Denny Laine, except where noted.
Side One
 "Japanese Tears" - 4:43
 "Danger Zone" - 3:06
 "Clock on the Wall" - 4:41
 "Send Me the Heart" (Denny Laine, Paul McCartney) - 3:35
 "Go Now" (Larry Banks, Milton Bennett) - 3:15
 "Same Mistakes" - 3:41
 "Silver" - 4:05
Side Two
 "Say You Don't Mind" - 3:08
 "Somebody Ought to Know the Way" - 3:15
 "Lovers Light" - 3:01
 "Guess I'm Only Fooling" - 2:30
 "Nothing to Go By" - 3:07
 "I Would Only Smile" - 3:18
 "Weep for Love" - 4:32

Personnel 

The Denny Laine Band
Denny Laine - Guitars, keyboards, piano, vocals
Jo Jo Laine - Backing vocals, lead vocals on "Same Mistakes"
Gordon Sellar - Bass guitar
Andy Richards - Keyboards, piano, organ
Mike Piggott - Violin
Steve Holley - Drums, percussion

Wings
Denny Laine - Guitar, lead vocals (1972, 1974, 1978)
Paul McCartney - Bass, backing vocals (1972, 1974, 1978)
Linda McCartney - Keyboards, backing vocals (1972, 1974, 1978)
Henry McCullough - Guitar (1972)
Denny Seiwell - Drums (1972)
Jimmy McCulloch - Guitar (1974)
Geoff Britton - Drums (1974)
Laurence Juber - Guitar (1978)
Steve Holley - Drums (1978)

Reissues 

The Denny Laine Band - Weep for Love (Toshiba Records, 1983)
Denny Laine, Paul McCartney & Friends - In Flight (Breakaway Records, 1984)
Denny Laine - Japanese Tears (Teichiku Records Co., Japanese CD reissue, 1992)
Denny Laine & Friends - Danger Zone (LaserLight Records, 1995)
Denny Laine - Go Now (Excerpts) (Prime Cuts, 1995)
Denny Laine/Paul McCartney - Send Me the Heart (United Audio Entertainment, 2001)
Denny Laine featuring Paul & Linda McCartney - Spreading My Wings (Cherry Red Records, 2002)
Denny Laine with Paul McCartney - Send Me The Heart (United Audio Entertainment, 2005)
Denny Laine with Paul McCartney and friends - Lover's Light (Collectors Dream Records, 2012)

References

1980 albums
Denny Laine albums